Love and Savagery is a Canadian-Irish drama film directed by John N. Smith and released in 2009.

The film stars Allan Hawco as Michael, a geologist from Newfoundland and Labrador who travels to Ballyvaughan, Ireland to study limestone, and causes a scandal when he enters a romantic relationship with Cathleen (Sarah Greene), an orphan girl from the village who is about to enter the convent as a Roman Catholic nun. The film's cast also includes Martha Burns, Nicholas Campbell, Andy Jones, Louise Nicol, Mack Furlong and Sean Panting.

Awards
The film garnered four Genie Award nominations at the 30th Genie Awards in 2010:
Best Supporting Actress: Martha Burns
Best Overall Sound: Claude Hazanavicius, Daniel Bisson, Jean-Charles Desjardins and Bernard Gariépy Strobl
Best Original Score: Bertrand Chénier
Best Make-Up: Diane Simard and Réjean Goderre
Burns won the award for Best Supporting Actress.

References

External links

2009 films
English-language Canadian films
Canadian romantic drama films
English-language Irish films
Irish romantic drama films
2009 romantic drama films
Films directed by John N. Smith
2000s English-language films
2000s Canadian films